Hang Seng China Enterprises Index is a stock market index of The Stock Exchange of Hong Kong for H share, red chip, and P chip.

H share is a class of ordinary share of the mainland China incorporated company that only traded outside the mainland China; all of these companies were majority owned by the central or regional Chinese government. In contrast, civilian-run enterprises of the mainland China listed their companies in Hong Kong using "foreign"-incorporated holding companies as P chip (either Bermuda, the Cayman Islands or Hong Kong); those using the same method but majority owned by the central or regional Chinese government, was known as red chip; red chip had their own separated index.

In August 2017, it was announced that the index would be reformed, which P chip and red chip would be added to the index in March 2018.

Some of the constituents of Hang Seng China Enterprises Index was also the constituents of Hang Seng Index.

Constituents
As of August 2022 there are 50 constituent stocks.

See also
 Hang Seng Index - blue chip index of the Stock Exchange of Hong Kong
 Hang Seng China-Affiliated Corporations Index - index for Red chip of the Stock Exchange of Hong Kong

References

External links
Official website

Hang Seng Bank stock market indices
Hong Kong stock market indices
H shares